Podkovák is a Nature Reserve within the Český les Landscape Protected Area in the western part of the Pilsen Region of the Czech Republic. It protects a small raised bog forest in a small depression with Pinus uncinata ssp. rotundata. Wood grouses appear in the reserve.

Sources

External links 

Nature reserves in the Czech Republic
Protected areas in Tachov District